This article lists the heads of state of Ivory Coast, officially the Republic of Côte d'Ivoire, since the country gained independence from France in 1960. Alassane Ouattara has been serving as President of Ivory Coast since 4 December 2010.

List of officeholders 
Political parties

Other factions

Symbols
 Elected unopposed
 Died in office

See also

Ivory Coast
Vice President of Ivory Coast
List of heads of government of Ivory Coast
List of colonial governors of Ivory Coast
First Lady of Ivory Coast
Politics of Ivory Coast
Lists of office-holders

Notes

Timeline

Latest election

Sources
 http://www.rulers.org
 Guinness Book of Kings Rulers & Statesmen, Clive Carpenter, Guinness Superlatives Ltd

References

i

Heads of state of Ivory Coast
Heads of state
1960 establishments in Ivory Coast